The EF-Type was a Turbocharged 90° V6 racing engine developed by Renault Sport, the engine was used by Equipe Renault Elf in Formula One from 1977 to 1985.
This engine derived from the CH series designed by François Castaing, the F1 engine was developed by Bernard Dudot.

Renault's decision to use its 1500 cc V6 turbo engines in F1 was one of the boldest decisions ever taken in the sport.
In nine full seasons competing against normally aspirated 3000 cc engines, they gave an excellent account of themselves, with:
One World Championship Runner-Up title in 1983.
20 race wins (15 with Renault, 5 with Lotus).
50 pole positions (32 with Renault, 18 with Lotus).
51 podium finishes (25 with Renault, 20 with Lotus, six with Ligier).
Ultimately, as a result of their success, all F1 teams adopted turbo engines in the 1985 season.

Engines

EF1

1977–1979
EF1:  Bore x Stroke  7.0:1 Compression, one Garrett turbocharger.

1979–1983
With its two small turbochargers, this engine reduced turbo lag considerably. It brought Renault its first F1 race win with a turbo engine (Dijon 1979). It would undergo a number of significant changes over the years (electronic injection and two-flap air intake in 1982, water injection at air intake in ) and its horsepower would gradually increase, eventually reaching . In all, it claimed 15 race wins, 30 pole positions and 19 pole positions and saw both Renault and Alain Prost finish second in the Constructors' and Drivers' Championships respectively. It was also supplied to the Lotus team in 1983.
EF1:  Bore x Stroke  7.0:1 Compression, two KKK turbochargers.

EF4

1984
This engine marked the return of Garrett turbochargers. Fitted to the Renault RE50, Lotus 95T and Ligier JS23, it could not break the dominance of the Porsche built TAG V6 engine which powered the McLaren MP4/2 to 12 wins out of 16 races. It nevertheless notched up 11 podium finishes and three pole positions and allowed Lotus driver Elio de Angelis to finish the  season in 3rd place. 1984 marked the first year since 1978 that a Renault engine did not win a Formula One race.
EF4:  Bore x Stroke  7.0:1 Compression, two Garrett turbochargers.

It was the last engine to be badged "Renault Gordini", as there was now a new name to promote: Renault Sport.

"Type-Bis" early 1985
This engine's defining characteristics were its centralized electronic injection and ignition control systems. It was responsible for one race win, two pole positions and two podium finishes.
EF4:  Bore x Stroke  7.0:1 Compression, two Garrett turbochargers.

EF15

mid-1985
With greater fuel economy thanks to its new dimensions and a lower boost pressure, its horsepower nevertheless oscillated between 
It earned two race wins and five pole positions for Lotus, as well as ten podium finishes (four for the Lotus 97T, four for the Ligier JS25 and two for the Renault RE60).
EF15:  Bore x Stroke  7.5:1 Compression, two Garrett turbochargers.

"Type-B" early 1986
This engine boasted two innovative features that would soon gain widespread acceptance – static ignition and pneumatic valve actuation
– which allowed it to reach 12,500 rpm. Capable of generating  in race trim, it would record two race wins and five pole positions with Lotus, as well as five podium finishes (three with Lotus and two with Ligier). It powered the Lotus 98T and the Ligier JS27.
EF15B:  Bore x Stroke  7.5:1 Compression, two Garrett turbochargers.

"Type-C" mid 1986

Formula One World Championship results

References

EF
Formula One engines
Gasoline engines by model
V6 engines